The Women's 200 metre backstroke competition of the 2022 European Aquatics Championships was held on 11 and 12 August 2022.

Records
Prior the competition, the existing world, European and championship records were as follows.

Results

Heats
The heats were started on 11 August at 09:44.

Semifinals
The semifinals were started at 18:25.

Final
The final was held at 18:00.

References

Women's 200 metre backstroke